The 1953 Argentine Primera División was the 62nd season of top-flight football in Argentina. The season began on April 5 and ended on November 22.

Gimnasia y Esgrima (LP) returned to Primera while the other team of the city, Estudiantes (LP), was relegated. River Plate won its 11th league title.

League standings

References

Argentine Primera División seasons
Argentine Primera Division
1